Jamal Abdel Nasser Mosque ( Masjid Jamal 'Abd an-Nasser) is the largest mosque in al-Bireh, West Bank, Palestine. Located in the Downtown district of the city, the mosque is named after the late Egyptian president and Arab leader Gamal Abdel Nasser.

On March 14, 2002, the Israeli Army (IDF) took over the mosque and used its minaret for sniping, killing four Palestinians.

On September 22, 2007, dozens of wives of Hamas-affiliated political prisoners and other female Hamas members marched from the Jamal Abdel Nasser Mosque to Al-Manara Square in protest of what they saw as the politically motivated detentions of their relatives by the Palestinian Authority (PA). They were prevented from reaching the square when PA security forces used tear gas to disperse them.

References

Mosques in Al-Bireh